Futurista is the title of Pidzama Porno's second album, released in 1996 by MAMI Tapes. The work has been around since 1990 though, as the material was circulating on pirated tapes. Marcin Swietlicki said this album is a "Miraculously recovered, missing part in Polish rock"

Track listing

The band

Krzysztof "Grabaż" Grabowski – vocal
Andrzej "Kozak" Kozakiewicz – guitar, vocal
Sławek "Dziadek" Mizerkiewicz – guitar, chords
Rafał "Kuzyn" Piotrowiak – drums
Julian "Julo" Piotrowiak - bass guitar
Filary - guitars, keyboard, sampler.

and:

Kasia Nosowska - chords
Lenin - chords
Rysiek Sarbak - trumpet
Fiolet - sax

References
http://pidzamaporno.art.pl/?p=plyta&id=5
https://web.archive.org/web/20090917170341/http://muzyka.onet.pl/0,36236,36236,biografie.html

Pidżama Porno albums
1990 albums